Ahmad Shah, Crown Prince of Afghanistan (Dari: احمد شاه خان, Pashto: احمد شاه خان; born 23 September 1934) is the second son of Mohammad Zahir Shah, the former King of Afghanistan. He holds the title of Head of the House of Barakzai since his father's death in July 2007.

Biography
At the time of his birth he was second in the line of succession to the throne after his older brother Muhammed Akbar Khan, Crown Prince of Afghanistan. However, following the death of his brother on 26 November 1942, he became first in the line of succession and the heir apparent and Crown Prince.

He was educated first at Esteqlal High School, and College of Military Science, in Kabul.

Later he attended the University of Oxford, the Institut d'études politiques de Paris (IEP) and later spent time working at the Ministry of Foreign Affairs in Kabul.

His father's reign ended on 17 July 1973, when he was ousted by a coup with Afghanistan being declared a republic by Mohammad Daoud Khan, a member of the royal family. The Crown Prince was one of fourteen members of the royal family arrested following the coup. He was allowed to leave the country for Rome on 26 July. Following the overthrow of the monarchy, the Crown Prince settled in the state of Virginia, United States, and took to writing poetry. He currently writes poetry in Alexandria, Virginia.

Since the death of his father on 23 July 2007, he is the oldest surviving male heir of the last reigning King of Afghanistan.

Unlike his father, he does not possess the official title Baba-e-Melat-e-Afghanistan (Father of the Nation of Afghanistan).

Marriage and children
He was married at Chilstoon Palace in Kabul on 22 November 1961 to Princess Khatul Begum (born 1940), daughter of Sardar Muhammad Umar Khan Zikeria, by his wife, Princess Sultana Begum, fourth daughter of Mohammed Nadir Shah, King of Afghanistan (d. 1933). He has two sons and one daughter:

 Prince Muhammad Zahir Khan (born 26 May 1962). He married Princess Oshila Begum (b. 1958). They have a daughter:
 Princess Roxanne Khanum (born 1988).
 Prince Muhammad Emel Khan (born 1969).
 Princess Hawa Khanum (born 27 October 1963). She married Sultan Muhammad Nawaz (b. 1963) and later divorced.

Ancestry

References

Barakzai dynasty
Heirs apparent who never acceded
1934 births
Living people
Afghan princes
Pashtun people
Afghan expatriates in Italy
Afghan emigrants to the United States
Alumni of the University of Oxford
20th-century Afghan people
21st-century Afghan people
Sons of kings